The Malacca State Executive Council is the State Executive Council (or EXCO) as executive authority of the Government of Malacca, Malaysia. The Council comprises the Chief Minister, appointed by the Governor on the basis that he is able to command a majority in the Malacca State Legislative Assembly, a number of members made up of members of the Assembly, the State Secretary, the State Legal Adviser and the State Financial Officer.

This Council is similar in structure and role to the Cabinet of Malaysia, while being smaller in size. As federal and state responsibilities differ, there are a number of portfolios that differ between the federal and state governments.

Members of the Council are selected by the Chief Minister, appointed by the Governor. Unlike Sabah and Sarawak, the Council has no ministry, but instead a number of committees; each committee will take care of certain state affairs, activities and departments. Members of the Council are always the chair of a committee.

Members

Full members 

Members of the Council, since 26 November 2021, are:

Ex officio members

See also 
 List of Yang di-Pertua Negeri of Malacca
 Chief Ministers of Malacca
 Malacca State Legislative Assembly
 Adly EXCO
 First Sulaiman EXCO
 Second Sulaiman EXCO

References

External links 
 Malacca State Government

Politics of Malacca
Malacca